Colts Cricket Club  is a first-class cricket team based in Colombo, Sri Lanka. They have won 6 first class tournaments of Sri Lanka domestic league as in 1991/92, 1999/2000, 2001/02, 2004/05, 2008/09 and 2011/12 and 2 Premier Limited Overs Tournament as in 1998/99 and 2010/11.

History
The club is officially known as Colombo Colts Cricket Club and was established in 1873 and re-organised in 1886. The club was originally based in Pettah, Colombo. The club has a first-class team and other teams like Club B, under-23 and under-25 as well as women's teams.

Honours
 P Saravanamuttu Trophy (1) 
1991–92

 Premier Trophy (4) 
1999–00 
2001–02 
2004–05
2008–09
2011–12

Current squad
These players featured in matches for Colts CC in 2019/20

Players with international caps are listed in bold

Notable players

 Nuwan Kulasekara
 Angelo Mathews
 Thisara Perera
 Roshen Silva
 Chaminda Vaas
 Malinda Warnapura
 Roy Dias
 Gamini Goonesena
 Wirantha Fernando

Home ground

Colts Cricket Club Ground is the club's primary venue for home matches.

References

External links
 Cricinfo
 Colts Cricket Club at CricketArchive

Sri Lankan first-class cricket teams
Sports clubs in Colombo
Cricket in Colombo